Angie Sage (born 20 June 1952) is an English author of children's literature, including the Septimus Heap series, the TodHunter Moon trilogy, and the Araminta Spook series (Araminta Spookie, in the United States).

Life
According to her publisher's biography, Sage grew up in the Thames Valley, London and Kent. She tells how her publisher father brought home blank books, and she would write and illustrate her own stories in these. She began to study medicine, but moved instead to the Art School in Leicester to study graphic design and illustration, using these skills to begin illustrating books.

Her first novel was the first in her Septimus Heap series: Magyk.

Board books
1981: The Nightmare Song - from Iolanthe by Gilbert and Sullivan
1998: Alphabet Express
1999: Number Bus
2000: Rainbow Rocket
2000: Animals on Safari
2000: Noah's Ark
2001: Alphabet Bus
2001: Learning Bus
2001: Farmyard Families
2002: Sea Life Sub

Bibliography
The following is a list of books written by Angie Sage. It does not include books that were only illustrated by her.

Septimus Heap series
Septimus Heap, Book One: Magyk (Released 2005)
Septimus Heap, Book Two: Flyte (Released 2006)
Septimus Heap, Book Three: Physik (Released 2007)
Septimus Heap, Book Four: Queste (Released 2008)
Septimus Heap, The Magykal Papers (Released 2009, supplement to the series)
Septimus Heap, Book Five: Syren (Released 2009)
Septimus Heap, Book Six: Darke (Released 2011)
Septimus Heap, Book Seven: Fyre (Released 2013)

TodHunter Moon trilogy (sequel to Septimus Heap series)
TodHunter Moon, Book One: PathFinder (Released 2014)
TodHunter Moon, Book Two: SandRider (Released 13 October 2015)
TodHunter Moon, Book Three: StarChaser (Released 11 October 2016) 

Araminta Spook series
Araminta Spook, Book One: My Haunted House (Released 2006)
Araminta Spook, Book Two: The Sword in the Grotto (Released 2006)
Araminta Spook, Book Three: Frognapped (Released 2007)
Araminta Spook, Book Four: Vampire Brat (Released 2007)
Araminta Spook, Book Five: Ghostsitters (Released 2008)
Araminta Spook, Book Six: Gargoyle Hall (Released 2014 in the UK)
Araminta Spook, Book Seven: Skeleton Island (Released 2015 in the UK)

References

External links
Angie Sage article at Kidsreads.com
Angie Sage interview at Bookbrowse.com

English fantasy writers
English horror writers
English illustrators
British women illustrators
British children's writers
British children's book illustrators
Writers who illustrated their own writing
Living people
1952 births
People from Kent
English women writers
20th-century illustrators of fairy tales
21st-century illustrators of fairy tales
Women science fiction and fantasy writers
20th-century English women
20th-century English people